Umali may refer to:
 Umali (surname), Tagalog-language surname
 Umali, India, a village in the Buldhana district of Maharashtra
 Om Ali, a dessert in Egyptian cuisine